Davide Moro (born 2 January 1982) is an Italian former professional footballer who plays as a central midfielder.

Career

On 17 August 2009, Moro was loaned from Empoli to Livorno. He already played twice for Empoli in the 2009–10 Coppa Italia before leaving the club for fellow Tuscan side Livorno.

In 2010-11 season he returned to Empoli and partnered with Mirko Valdifiori and Gianluca Musacci in central midfield, he was injured in November. On 9 December 2017, he was signed by Audace Cerignola.

He is also a singer, and covers Dream Theater songs with his band Progeny.

References

External links
Davide Moro Biography
aic.football.it 

1982 births
Italian footballers
Empoli F.C. players
S.S.D. Varese Calcio players
U.S. Livorno 1915 players
U.S. Salernitana 1919 players
U.S. Cremonese players
Serie A players
Serie B players
Serie C players
Association football midfielders
Living people
Sportspeople from Taranto
Footballers from Apulia